Joseph Xu Zhixuan (7 July 1916 - 8 December 2008) was a Chinese Catholic bishop of the Diocese of Chongqing, China.

Biography
Xu was born Xu Huafu in Dachuan District of Dazhou, Sichuan, on July 7, 1916. From 1928 to 1934 he studied in small Catholic churches in both Ba County and Zhong County. From 1934 to 1939 he studied at Zhenye Middle School. After graduating the Wan County Institute of Philosophy in 1943, he taught at a Catholic church in Zhong County. He was ordained a priest in 1946. In 1947 he was accepted to the Fu Jen Catholic University. After university, he went back to the Wan County Institute of Philosophy as a teacher there.

In 1950 he entered the Beijing National Normal University. After graduating in 1953, he became a maths teacher at the Beijing No. 4 High School. In 1959 he was transferred to a state farm in northeast China's Heilongjiang province to reform through labour. In 1971, the Chinese government allowed him to return home. He was rehabilitated in 1978, after the Cultural Revolution. In 1982 he became a priest at a Catholic church in Da County,  and served until 1998. He was ordained assistant bishop of the Roman Catholic Diocese of Wanxian on July 31, 1989. He was promoted to become bishop on January 16, 2001.

He died on December 8, 2008, aged 93.

References

1916 births
2008 deaths
Sichuanese Roman Catholics
People from Dazhou
Catholic University of Peking alumni
21st-century Roman Catholic bishops in China